Smoke tree, or Smoketree, may refer to any of several plants, some of whose parts are finely divided and give the appearance of smoke from a distance:

 Cotinus, a genus of garden shrub commonly referred to as the Smoketree.
 Cotinus coggygria, the European or Eurasian Smoketree
 Cotinus obovatus, the American Smoketree
 Psorothamnus spinosus, a Legume tree of the American Mojave desert commonly referred to as the Smoketree. In the spring it has vibrant purple blooms.
 Euphorbia cotinifolia, or Tropical Smoketree

See also
Smokebush